The Blithewold Mansion, Gardens and Arboretum is an arboretum of , located at 101 Ferry Road, Bristol, Rhode Island, midway between Newport and Providence, Rhode Island, on Bristol Harbor with views over Narragansett Bay. It includes a mansion, with a  lawn and over 300 species of woody plants in its arboretum and gardens, including both native and exotic species.

The Mansion and its grounds were established in the 1890s by Augustus and Bessie Van Wickle as their summer retreat. Augustus Van Wickle was from Hazleton, Pennsylvania, with a fortune in the coal-mining business  and a donor of the Van Wickle Gates at Brown University. Today's grounds are primarily the design of John DeWolf, and date between 1896 and 1913.  The property was listed on the National Register of Historic Places in 1980.

Blithwold's grounds include species from North America, Europe, China and Japan. Specimen trees include magnolia (Magnolia spp.), linden (Tilia spp.), Ginkgo (Ginkgo biloba), Black Tupelo (Nyssa sylvatica), Dawn Redwood (Metasequoia glyptostroboides), Franklinia (Franklinia alatamaha), Eastern Hemlock (Tsuga canadensis), various oaks (Quercus spp.) and beeches (Fagus spp.). Other notable trees include a weeping Pagoda Tree (Styphnolobium japonicum 'Pendula'), Hiba (Thujopsis dolabrata), Katsura (Cercidiphyllum japonicum), and Sugi (Cryptomeria japonica).

Blithewold has maintained contacts with the Arnold Arboretum ever since 1926, when staff botanists visited Blithewold to see the Chinese toon tree (Toona sinensis) in flower for what was believed to be the first time in the United States.

See also 
 List of botanical gardens and arboretums in Rhode Island
 National Register of Historic Places listings in Bristol County, Rhode Island

References

External links

 Blithewold Mansion official site

1895 establishments in Rhode Island
Arboreta in Rhode Island
Botanical gardens in Rhode Island
Houses on the National Register of Historic Places in Rhode Island
Historic house museums in Rhode Island
Museums in Bristol County, Rhode Island
Protected areas of Bristol County, Rhode Island
Buildings and structures in Bristol, Rhode Island
Houses in Bristol County, Rhode Island
National Register of Historic Places in Bristol County, Rhode Island